Kjetil Bjørklund (born 18 March 1967 in Lillehammer) is a Norwegian politician for the Socialist Left Party.

He was elected to the Norwegian Parliament from Oppland in 2001, but was not re-elected in 2005. During the second cabinet Stoltenberg, Bjørklund was appointed political advisor in the Ministry of the Environment, a post he left after three months.

On the local level Bjørklund was a deputy member of Nordre Land municipality council from 1991 to 2003. He chaired the local party chapter from 1999 to 2001.

He has been active in the Norwegian Society for the Conservation of Nature.

References

1967 births
Living people
Politicians from Lillehammer
Socialist Left Party (Norway) politicians
Members of the Storting
Oppland politicians
21st-century Norwegian politicians